The Attention-Deficit/Hyperactivity Disorder Investigator Symptom Rating Scale (AISRS) is a rating scale for evaluation of attention-deficit hyperactivity disorder (ADHD) severity and improvement. It is an 18-item clinician-administered scale.

See also
 ADHD Rating Scale (ADHD-RS)

References

Attention deficit hyperactivity disorder
Mental disorders screening and assessment tools